Hopes Die Last is an Italian post-hardcore band from Rome, formed in 2004. Previously signed to StandBy Records, the band has self-released their latest EP. At the time of their breakup the line-up consisted of Daniele Tofani (lead vocals), Marco Mantovani (guitar/backing vocals) and Luigi Magliocca (guitar). To date, the band has released two studio albums and three EPs.

On January 6, 2017, Hopes Die Last announced their breakup. The remaining band members, except Luigi Magliocca, formed a new band entitled ALPHAWOLVES.

In February 2022 the band announced on Instagram that they were getting back together with their original lineup.

History

2005-09: Early years and EPs 
The band formed in 2004 from Ladispoli near Rome, as a group of teenage friends. The band played shows in Rome and, after, in the whole Italy. Hopes Die Last released Aim For Tomorrow in 2005, an EP that contains six songs. The genre of this EP is much different respect to their actual post-hardcore. Aim for Tomorrow was a melodic hardcore/punk album just with signs of screaming. Aim For Tomorrow had their original line-up but, instead of "Becko" singing, it was Marco Mantovani who sang at the time and of course with Nicolò "Nick" with some singing and screaming.

In 2008, they were able to break into the emocore scene with the release of the EP Your Face Down Now. Thanks to their new album, the band sang in Germany, England, France, USA and Japan. The EP is considered the most influenced by emo sound work of the band and contains six songs and an acoustic bonus track for Japan. One of tracks ("Call Me Sick Boy") is still one of the most popular songs of the band and was re-recorded for Hopes Die Last's next album. The EP is the first record by Hopes Die Last to include Marco "Becko" Calanca for the singing vocals but also the last to include former screaming vocalist Nick and former guitarist Jacopo.

The band signed with StandBy Records in order to release the next work (Six Years Home) as a major record release, after being signed to Wynona Records, an Italian record company that mainly produces post-hardcore records.

2009-11: Departure of Nick and Six Years Home 
After their tour in United States and some dates in Europe, Nick (former screaming vocalist) decided to leave the band. He posted on Hopes Die Last Myspace page the following message : 
"Ehy guys what’s up? this is Nick… after months thinking about it, I just realized I didn’t want to be the singer/screamer of Hopes Die Last anymore so here I am, to tell you I left the band. I still love the other guys in the band and we’re still friends like before. I’m leaving the band just because I’m not happy to play this kind of music anymore. I’m sorry. Keep on supporting Hopes Die Last. I’ll be back with a new project in some months so don’t forget about me - Nick". After being the screamer for some months for the post-hardcore band Helia, in 2011 he started producing electronic music under the name of "Razihel".

In August 2009, the band released the first full-length album, called Six Years Home, the record contains ten songs. Six Years Home is also the first by the group to include Daniele Tofani, the current screaming vocalist of Hopes Die Last. One music video for Some Like it Cold was released in promotion of the album in November, the second video was Johnny's Light Sucks, released in October 2011. This album is usually considered more oriented on post-hardcore than the precedent.

In 2010, the band was in a Tour for Italy and other European countries. The cover of the Katy Perry's song, Firework was released on March 3, 2011, on MySpace.  The second Hopes Die Last's full album contains this song.

2011-12: Trust No One 
Calanca (vocals/guitar) and Tofani (bass/vocals) started an alternative rock side project called Everland, releasing its debut album Once Upon A Time in December 2011.

Hopes Die Last are recording a new album coming out in 2012. In October, the band leaves for the UK tour with Attack Attack!, then proceed with further dates in Europe, East Europe and Russia. On November 14, 2011, exactly 3 months prior, Standby Records posted a song trailer for the upcoming single/video for a new song and revealed the album title. The singles Unleash Hell and Never Trust the Hazel Eyed were released in January 2012, followed in few months by the third single Keep Your Hands Off. The new album was finally announced with the name Trust No One and was released on February 14, 2012.

2013: Wolfpack EP 
On April 23, 2013, the band announced that Nekso is now a full member of the band. Nekso had already collaborated with the band on the song "Keep Your Hands Off", and also appeared on the music video of this song. On May 1, 2013, the band announced that they were now part of the Monster Energy family. On May 20, 2013, the band announced a new release for June 25, 2013, titled Wolfpack (EP) along with the release of a new single titled "Cheaters Must Die". The second single of Wolfpack (EP) is titled "Hellbound" and was released on June 3, 2013. Wolfpack (EP) was released on June 25, 2013. The digital version is available on media stores, and physical only on the band's store at shopbenchmack.com. On June 26, 2013, following the release of the EP, Hopes Die Last posted a third music video titled "Promises - Nero Cover". On December 3, 2013, the band posted a fourth music video for the song "The Wolfpack" which doesn't feature Valerio "Nekso" Corsi, suggesting he is not longer part of the band. Almost one year after the release of "The Wolfpack" music video, Hopes Die Last released a fifth music video for the song "Blackhearted".

2015: Lineup changes and Alpha Wolves 
On April 19, 2015, the band posted a teaser on YouTube to announce their coming back. This teaser was followed by a second one on April 29, 2015, where the name Alpha Wolves was shown for the first time. The band kept teasing on the social media and then confirmed the news on May 24, 2015, by announcing the release of their upcoming single entitled Alpha Wolves on June 3, 2015. This news was shortly followed by a Facebook post on May 28, 2015, stating that Marco "Becko" Calanca and Ivan Panella decided to part ways with Hopes Die Last, to dedicate themselves to new projects. the post also introduced new bassist Yuri Santurri and new drummer Danilo Menna. Alpha Wolves was released on iTunes on June 3, 2015, and was followed by a music video on YouTube.

2017: Breakup and ALPHAWOLVES 
On January 6, 2017, the band announced the end of the band on their Facebook account. The remaining band members, except guitarist Luigi Magliocca, formed a new band entitled ALPHAWOLVES. They released their debut single Bayonets on January 22, 2017.

2022: Reunion 
As of February 25, 2022, Hopes Die Last announced their reunion with the original band line-up. On March 4, 2022, a lyric video of the new single Silence Broken was released, followed by the music video of the same song on May 31, 2022. In the following months, the band released several singles, including Better Off Dead on April 25, 2022, White Eyes on June 28, 2022, and Dead Boy on September 2, 2022.

Band members

Current lineup
 Nicolò (Razihel) Arquilla – lead vocals (2004-2009, 2022–present)
 Marco Mantovani - lead guitar (2004-2017, 2022–present)
 Jacopo Omar Iannariello - rhythm guitar (2004–2008, 2022–present)
 Marco "Becko" Calanca - bass, keyboards, clean vocals (2004-2015, 2022–present)
 Ivan Panella - drums (2004-2015, 2022–present)

Former members
 Valerio "Nekso" Corsi - keyboards, electronics (2013)
 Luigi Magliocca - rhythm guitar (2008-2017)
 Daniele Tofani - unclean vocals (2009-2017), clean vocals (2015-2017)
 Yuri Santurri - bass (2015-2017)
 Danilo Menna - drums, percussion (2015-2017)

Timeline

Discography

Albums & EPs

Singles

Music videos

References

External links
 Official website. Archived February 4, 2014.

Post-hardcore groups
Musical groups established in 2004
Italian musical groups
Musical groups from Rome